Louis Edward "Hap" Kuehn (April 2, 1901 – March 30, 1981) was an American diver who competed in the 1920 Summer Olympics.

In 1920 he won the gold medal in the 3 m springboard competition.  He went to college at Oregon State University.

See also
 List of members of the International Swimming Hall of Fame

References

External links
profile
International Swimming Hall of Fame

1901 births
1981 deaths
Divers at the 1920 Summer Olympics
Olympic gold medalists for the United States in diving
Oregon State University alumni
Sportspeople from Oregon
American male divers
Medalists at the 1920 Summer Olympics